Pimkie is a French fast fashion label and chain store for young women. Its headquarters is in Villeneuve-d'Ascq, France. They have offices in Germany, Spain, and Italy. The company is owned by Association Familiale Mulliez, through the Fashion Cube company. The first shop was opened in 1971 in Lille. 

After a long expansion period, Pimkie reached its peak presence in 2018 with 716 stores in 30 countries, but the company began to face difficulties in the late 2010s.

Pimkie has a large social-media following, with 1.3m followers on Instagram.

History
In 1971, French fashion entrepreneurs launched a new trend: pants for women. Thanks to some success, the range was expanded to offer women's ready-to-wear fashions for 15-25 year-olds. The first Pimckie store opened in Lille.

In 1983, Pimckie became Pimkie. At the end of the 1980s, Pimkie had established itself throughout France with around 100 stores. The brand grew internationally over 20 years. In 2015, the brand expanded its target market from 15-25 year-olds to 18-35 year-olds. By 2018, it had 716 stores in 30 countries, mainly in Europe, five purchasing-sourcing offices (Morocco, Tunisia, Turkey, China, and Hong Kong), one main warehouse in Germany, and five distribution warehouses in Europe.

The company began to face difficulties in late 2010 following a proposed agreement on an indefinite number of contract terminations in France. In 2017, Pimkie announced it would close some 50 stores in Germany and Austria, amid several executive departures. In August 2018, it made 208 people redundant in France and closed 37 stores. In December 2018, Béatrice Lafon was appointed as CEO. The bankruptcy of Pimkie's Belgian and Swiss subsidiaries was announced in 2021, amid management issues and the pandemic.

References

External links

French fashion
Clothing brands of France
Clothing companies of France
Clothing retailers of France
French companies established in 1971
Clothing companies established in 1971